The 2020 Argentine Torneo Federal A also known as the 2020 Torneo Transición Federal A, was the eighth season of the Torneo Federal A, the regionalised third tier of the Argentine football league system. The tournament is reserved for teams indirectly affiliated to the Asociación del Fútbol Argentino (AFA), while teams affiliated to AFA have to play the Primera B Metropolitana, which is the other third tier competition. The competition was contested by 26 of the 30 teams that took part in the 2019–20 season, which was suspended and subsequently abandoned due to the COVID-19 pandemic, as it was optional to participate in this season. Two teams were promoted to Primera B Nacional and there was no relegation to Torneo Regional Federal Amateur. The regular season began on 4 December 2020 and ended on 31 January 2021.

Format
The competition will be split into two stages: First Promotion and Second Promotion, which in turn, will be split into two groups according to the groupings and placements of teams in the previous season. The top seven teams of each group at the time of suspension of the previous season will play in the First Promotion stage, where they will be split into two groups, while the remaining teams from each group will play in the first round of the Second Promotion stage. In both stages, the teams will be placed in groups according to the ones they were in for the previous season. In the First Promotion stage, each team will play against the other teams in their group once, with the group winners playing a final match on neutral ground to decide the first promoted team to the Primera Nacional.

In the Second Promotion stage, each team will also play against the other teams in their group once, with the group winners qualifying for a knockout tournament where they will be joined by the teams that fail to earn promotion in the First Promotion stage, with the losing team of the Final having a bye to the second knockout round. The winners of that knockout tournament will earn the second promotion berth to the Primera National. Also, the losing team of the Final of the Second Promotion, has the right to play a Promotion playoff against one team from Primera B Metropolitana. There was no relegation in this season.

Resignations
The following teams declined to participate in this season and will return in the 2021 season.

Club information

Zone A First Promotion

Zone B First Promotion

Zone A Second Promotion

Zone B Second Promotion

First Promotion stage

Zone A

Zone B
</onlyinclude>

First Promotion Final

Güemes was promoted to Primera B Nacional.

Second Promotion stage

Zone A

Zone B

Eliminatory Stage

First knockout round  
The first knockout round will be contested by 14 teams: the 12 teams ranked from 2nd to 7th place in their groups of the First Promotion stage and the top team from each group of the Second Promotion stage. In this round, the 14 teams will be seeded according to their performance and placements in the previous stage of the competition, with teams coming from the First Promotion stage being given a higher seed, and paired against a rival according to their seed: Team 1 vs. Team 14, Team 2 vs. Team 13 and so on, playing a single match on local ground. The 7 winners will advance to the second knockout round.

Second knockout round  
The second knockout round will be contested by 8 teams: the 7 winning teams from First knockout round and the losing team from the First Promotion Final. In this round, the 8 teams will be seeded according to their performance and placements in the previous stage of the competition, with teams coming from the First Promotion stage being given a higher seed, and paired against a rival according to their seed: Team 1 vs. Team 8, Team 2 vs. Team 7 and so on, playing a single match on local ground. The 4 winners will advance to the third knockout round.

Third knockout round  
The third knockout round will be contested by 4 teams: all the 4 winning teams from second knockout round. In this round, the 4 teams will be seeded according to their performance and placements in the previous stage of the competition, with teams coming from the First Promotion stage being given a higher seed, and paired against a rival according to their seed: Team 1 vs. Team 4, Team 2 vs. Team 3, playing a single match on local ground. The 2 winners will advance to the fourth knockout round.

Fourth knockout round  
The fourth knockout round will be contested by 2 teams: all the 2 winning teams from third knockout round. In this round, the 2 teams will be seeded according to their performance and placements in the previous stage of the competition, with teams coming from the First Promotion stage being given a higher seed, and paired against a rival according to their seed: Team 1 vs. Team 2, playing a single match on local ground. The winner will be promoted to Primera B Nacional and the loser will play a Promotion playoff against one team from Primera B Metropolitana.

Deportivo Maipú was promoted to Primera B Nacional.

Promotion playoff 
The loser of fourth knockout round will play a Promotion playoff against one team from Primera B Metropolitana.

San Telmo was promoted to Primera B Nacional.

See also
 2020 Copa de la Liga Profesional
 2020 Primera B Nacional
 2020 Primera B Metropolitana
 2019–20 Copa Argentina

References

External links
 Sitio Oficial de AFA   
 Ascenso del Interior  
 Interior Futbolero 
 Solo Ascenso  
 Mundo Ascenso  
 Promiedos  

Torneo Federal A seasons
3